Brigadier General Andre Retief  is a South African Army officer.

Military career 
On 24 January 2014 he took over command of the South African Army Armoured Formation from Brig Gen Chris Gildenhuys.

Awards and decorations

References 

South African Army generals
Living people
Year of birth missing (living people)